Aishwarya Lekshmi (born 6 September 1991) is an Indian actress and producer who predominantly works in Malayalam and Tamil films. She won several accolades including One Filmfare Award South and 3 SIIMA Awards.

She made her acting debut with 2017 Malayalam film Njandukalude Nattil Oridavela. She went on to appear in Mayaanadhi (2017), Varathan (2018), Vijay Superum Pournamiyum (2019), Argentina Fans Kaattoorkadavu (2019). Lekshmi made her Tamil debut with Action (2019).

Early life 
Aishwarya Lekshmi was born on 6 September 1991 in Trivandrum, Kerala, India.

Lekshmi did her schooling at Holy Angel's Convent Trivandrum, and at Sacred Heart Convent Girls Higher Secondary School, Thrissur. She completed her MBBS degree from Sree Narayana Institute of Medical Sciences (SNIMS), Ernakulam in 2017. She also completed her internship there. She resides in Trivandrum and Cochin.

Career 
Lekshmi has been modelling since 2014. She has appeared on the covers of magazines such as Flower World, Salt Studio, Vanitha and FWD Life. She has modelled for brands such as Chemmanur Jewellers, Karikkineth Silks, La Brenda, Ezva Boutique, Akshaya Jewels, Sri Lakshmi Jewellery etc.

She states that she "never planned on acting", but now that she has finished her studies, she decided to give it a try when she chanced upon casting call by Althaf Salim for the family-drama Njandukalude Nattil Oridavela starring Nivin Pauly and was cast in a prominent role. She then did the female lead in romantic thriller Mayaanadhi by Aashiq Abu. The film became a major success and her role as an aspiring actress garnered appreciation. In 2018, she appeared inVarathan with Fahadh Faasil. In 2019 Aishwarya appeared in three Malayalam films: Vijay Superum Pournamiyum, Argentina Fans Kaattoorkadavu and Brother's Day. She also made her Tamil debut with Action (2019), opposite Vishal. She then went on to appear in the Tamil Gangster film, Jagame Thandhiram (2021) alongside Dhanush, in which she played the role of Attilla. Which released in Netflix.

In 2022, she made her name in the industry through the role as ‘Poonguzhali’ in Mani Ratnam's historical action drama film Ponniyin Selvan: I.

Lekshmi made her debut as a producer with Tamil film Gargi.

Filmography

Films

Awards and nominations

References

External links 

 
 

Living people
Female models from Kerala
Indian film actresses
Actresses from Thiruvananthapuram
Actresses in Malayalam cinema
1991 births
Medical doctors from Kerala
Actresses in Tamil cinema
21st-century Indian medical doctors
Actresses in Telugu cinema